Thazi Township is a township of Meiktila District in the Mandalay Region of Burma.

Townships of Mandalay Region